Thomas Jefferson Campbell (February 22, 1793April 13, 1850) was an American politician who represented  in the United States House of Representatives from 1841 until 1843. He served as Clerk of the United States House of Representatives from 1847 until 1850.

Biography
Thomas Jefferson Campbell was born in Rhea County, Tennessee in 1793, and he attended the public schools.

Career
Assistant inspector general to Major General Cole's division of the East Tennessee Militia, Campbell served from September 14, 1813 to March 12, 1814. He was clerk of the Tennessee House of Representatives from 1817 to 1819, in 1821, and from 1825 to 1831. He was a Representative from 1833 to 1837.

Elected as a Whig to the Twenty-seventh Congress, Campbell served from March 4, 1841 to March 3, 1843.  He was an unsuccessful candidate in 1842 for re-election to the Twenty-eighth Congress. He was Clerk of the United States House of Representatives in the Thirtieth and Thirty-first Congresses.

Death
Campbell served from December 7, 1847 until his death in Washington, D.C. on April 13, 1850. He is interred at Calhoun, Tennessee.

References

External links

Clerks of the United States House of Representatives
1793 births
1850 deaths
Whig Party members of the United States House of Representatives from Tennessee
19th-century American politicians